Shri Sadguru Nityanand High-School in Sanikatta (founded 1965) is  one of the high schools in Uttar Kannada district.

Former headmasters
 V. K. Kawari (1964–65 in school), Retd. DPI (administration), Karnataka.
 Gopalkrishna P. Nayak (1965–1982)
 S. N. Bhat
 Ganga V. Nayak

Schools in Uttara Kannada district
High schools and secondary schools in Karnataka